Obsession is the second single from British singer Shayne Ward's third studio album, of the same name. It was released promotionally on February 14, 2011. Ward performed the single for the first time on The Alan Titchmarsh Show on the same day.

Background
"Obsession" was produced by Rami Yacoub, and was written by Yacoub, Ward and Savan Kotecha. In an interview with Digital Spy, Ward revealed that he chose 'Obsession' as the album's second single: "Obsession is one of those love-ballads that is perfect for an occasion. In this case, it's out on Valentines Day, so i hope that the song appeals to couples who are madly in love."

Track listing
 "Obsession" - 3:40

Chart performance

Release history

References

2011 singles
Shayne Ward songs
Songs written by Savan Kotecha
Songs written by Rami Yacoub
Song recordings produced by Rami Yacoub
Syco Music singles